The 1955 Alabama Crimson Tide football team (variously "Alabama", "UA" or "Bama") represented the University of Alabama in the 1955 college football season. It was the Crimson Tide's 61st overall and 22nd season as a member of the Southeastern Conference (SEC). The team was led by head coach Jennings B. Whitworth, in his first year, and played their home games at Denny Stadium in Tuscaloosa, Legion Field in Birmingham and at Ladd Stadium in Mobile, Alabama. They finished winless with a record of zero wins and ten losses (0–10 overall, 0–7 in the SEC).

On December 2, 1954, Harold Drew resigned as head coach of the Crimson Tide, and Jennings B. Whitworth was introduced as his successor. Whitworth brought a new system that was more oriented towards the running game. As a result, senior quarterback Bart Starr and the other Tide seniors saw little playing time. Whitworth, for his part, was allowed to hire only two assistants and required to retain the rest of Coach Drew's staff.

Alabama football hit rock bottom in 1955, going 0–10, the worst season in school history. It was only the third winless season in the history of the Crimson Tide, the others being the 0–4 teams in 1893 and 1895 when the program was just starting. For the season, Alabama averaged only 4.8 points per game and the opposition averaged 25.6. The Tide was shut out four times, the opposition never scored fewer than 20 points, and the smallest margin of defeat was 15 points in a 21–6 loss to Vanderbilt.

Schedule

Game summaries

Rice

Source:

To open the 1955 season, the Crimson Tide traveled to Houston and were shutout 20–0 by the Rice Owls of the Southwest Conference. After being held scoreless for the first three quarters, the Owls scored all three of their touchdowns in the fourth quarter. King Hill scored first on a one-yard run, a 45-yard Page Rogers run and on a two-yard Hill run. The loss brought Alabama's all-time record against Rice to 0–2.

Vanderbilt

Sources:

At Dudley Field, the Crimson Tide were defeated by the Vanderbilt Commodores 21–6 to open conference play. The loss brought Alabama's all-time record against Vanderbilt to 18–15–1.

TCU

Source:

In their home opener for the 1955 season, the Crimson Tide were shutout by the Texas Christian University (TCU) Horned Frogs 21–0 at Denny Stadium in what was the first all-time meeting between the schools. After a scoreless first half, Jim Swink scored all three of the Frogs' touchdowns in the second half. The scores came on runs of 65 and three-yards in the third and on a 10-yard run in the fourth quarter.

Tennessee

Sources:

In their annual rivalry game against Tennessee, Alabama was shut out for the third time in four weeks, and lost to the Volunteers, 20–0, at Legion Field. After a scoreless first quarter, the Vols took a 7–0 halftime lead after Johnny Majors threw a nine-yard touchdown pass to Roger Urbano on a fourth-down play early in the second quarter. A pair of touchdown runs in the fourth quarter, by Majors from two yards out and by Lon Herzbrun from one yard out, made the final score 20–0 in favor of the visitors. The loss brought Alabama's all-time record against Tennessee to 18–14–5.

Mississippi State

Sources:

On homecoming in Tuscaloosa, the Crimson Tide were defeated for the second consecutive year by the Mississippi State Maroons 26–7 at Denny Stadium. The first State touchdown was set up after the Maroons recovered a fumble at their 37-yard line. Bill Stanton scored on a one-yard run five plays later to give State a 6–0 lead. In the second quarter, William Morgan scored on a nine-yard run for the Maroons, but Alabama answered with a one-yard Clay Walls touchdown run to make the halftime score 13–7. State then pulled away in the second half to win 26–7 after 14-yard Morgan  run in the third and on a 27-yard Stanton pass to Morgan in the fourth. The loss brought Alabama's all-time record against Mississippi State to 28–9–3.

Georgia

Sources:

At Athens, the Crimson Tide lost to the Georgia Bulldogs 35–14 on homecoming at Sanford Stadium. The Bulldogs took a 14–0 halftime lead after James Harper threw a 25-yard touchdown pass to Laneair Roberts in the first and on a one-yard Robert Garrard run in the second quarter. The Tide then scored the first touchdown of the second half on a six-yard Donald Kinderknecht run to cut the Georgia lead to 14–7. However, the Bulldogs responded with a three-yard Henry Dukes run to make the score 21–7 at the start of the fourth. In the final quarter, Conrad Manisera scored on a four-yard run and on a one-yard John Bell run for Georgia and on a one-yard Bart Starr run for Alabama. The loss brought Alabama's all-time record against Georgia to 21–16–4.

Tulane

Sources:

Playing their annual home game at Ladd Stadium, the Crimson Tide lost 27–7 to the Tulane Green Wave in Mobile. The game was tied 7–7 at halftime after Tulane scored on a 12-yard Al Cottrell run in the first and Alabama scored on a short Billy Lumpkin run in the second quarter. After a one-yard Ronald Quillian run in the third to give Tulane a 14–7 lead, the Green Wave closed the game with a pair of fourth-quarter touchdowns o win 27–7. The fourth quarter scored were made by Quillian on a five-yard run and by Cottrell on a 17-yard interception return. The loss brought Alabama's all-time record against Tulane to 16–8–2.

Georgia Tech

Source:

Against Georgia Tech, Alabama lost their eleventh consecutive game in this 26–2 defeat by the Yellow Jackets at Legion Field. Tech took a 12–0 first quarter lead after they scored a pair of touchdowns in a 19-second span. The first came on a five-yard Richard Mattison run and the second on a 28-yard Kenny Thompson interception return. The Yellow Jackets' third score was set up early in the second quarter after Thomas Rose blocked an Alabama punt at the Tide's 12-yard line. Two plays later, Tech took a 19–0 lead after Paul Rotenberry scored on a five-yard run. After a scoreless third, in the fourth quarter Tech scored their final touchdown on a 34-yard Ronald Vann pass to Marion Ellis and Alabama got their only points on a safety in the final minute to make the score 26–2. The loss brought Alabama's all-time record against Georgia Tech to 18–16–3.

Miami (FL)

Sources:

On a Friday evening in Miami for the second consecutive year, Alabama was defeated by the Miami Hurricanes 34–12 at Burdine Stadium. The Hurricanes took a 14–0 first quarter lead on touchdowns scored by Don Bosseler on a four-yard run and by Whitey Rouviere on a 25-yard run. The Crimson Tide responded in the second quarter with a Donald Kinderknecht touchdown run to make the halftime score 14–6. Bosseler then gave Miami a 27–6 lead in the third quarter with his touchdown runs of two and 14-yards. In the fourth quarter, Bart Starr threw a seven-yard touchdown pass to Roy Forbus for Alabama and Ed Oliver scored on a four-yard touchdown run for Miami to make the final score 34–12. The loss brought Alabama's all-time record against Miami to 3–2.

Auburn

Sources:

For the second consecutive year, Alabama was shutout by the rival Auburn Tigers 26–0 at Legion Field and finished the season winless. After a scoreless first quarter, the Tigers took a 13–0 halftime lead with second quarter passes of 23 and 10-yards from Howell Tubbs to Jerry Elliott. Auburn then closed the game with a pair of fourth-quarter touchdowns on pair of short runs by Joe Childress and Tubbs to win 26–0. The loss brought Alabama's all-time record against Auburn to 9–10–1.

Personnel

Varsity letter winners

Coaching staff

References
General

 

Specific

Alabama
Alabama Crimson Tide football seasons
College football winless seasons
Alabama Crimson Tide football